Anopina iturbidensis is a species of moth of the family Tortricidae. It is found in Mexico, in the Sierra Madre Oriental from Nuevo Leon to Hidalgo and in the Sierra Madre Occidental from Durango to Jalisco.

References

Moths described in 2000
iturbidensis
Moths of Central America
Lepidoptera of Mexico
Endemic insects of Mexico
Fauna of the Sierra Madre Occidental
Fauna of the Sierra Madre Oriental